This is a list of electoral division results for the Australian 1977 federal election.

Overall
This section is an excerpt from 1977 Australian federal election § House of Representatives results

New South Wales

Banks 
This section is an excerpt from Electoral results for the Division of Banks § 1977

Barton 
This section is an excerpt from Electoral results for the Division of Barton § 1977

Bennelong 
This section is an excerpt from Electoral results for the Division of Bennelong § 1977

Berowra 
This section is an excerpt from Electoral results for the Division of Berowra § 1977

Blaxland 
This section is an excerpt from Electoral results for the Division of Blaxland § 1977

Bradfield 
This section is an excerpt from Electoral results for the Division of Bradfield § 1977

Calare 
This section is an excerpt from Electoral results for the Division of Calare § 1977

Chifley 
This section is an excerpt from Electoral results for the Division of Chifley § 1977

Cook 
This section is an excerpt from Electoral results for the Division of Cook § 1977

Cowper 
This section is an excerpt from Electoral results for the Division of Cowper § 1977

Cunningham 
This section is an excerpt from Electoral results for the Division of Cunningham § 1977

Dundas 
This section is an excerpt from Electoral results for the Division of Dundas § 1977

Eden-Monaro 
This section is an excerpt from Electoral results for the Division of Eden-Monaro § 1977

Farrer 
This section is an excerpt from Electoral results for the Division of Farrer § 1977

Grayndler 
This section is an excerpt from Electoral results for the Division of Grayndler § 1977

Gwydir 
This section is an excerpt from Electoral results for the Division of Gwydir § 1977

Hughes 
This section is an excerpt from Electoral results for the Division of Hughes § 1977

Hume 
This section is an excerpt from Electoral results for the Division of Hume § 1977

Hunter 
This section is an excerpt from Electoral results for the Division of Hunter § 1977

Kingsford Smith 
This section is an excerpt from Electoral results for the Division of Kingsford Smith § 1977

Lowe 
This section is an excerpt from Electoral results for the Division of Lowe § 1977

Lyne 
This section is an excerpt from Electoral results for the Division of Lyne § 1977

Macarthur 
This section is an excerpt from Electoral results for the Division of Macarthur § 1977

Mackellar 
This section is an excerpt from Electoral results for the Division of Mackellar § 1977

Macquarie 
This section is an excerpt from Electoral results for the Division of Macquarie § 1977

Mitchell 
This section is an excerpt from Electoral results for the Division of Mitchell § 1977

New England 
This section is an excerpt from Electoral results for the Division of New England § 1977

Newcastle 
This section is an excerpt from Electoral results for the Division of Newcastle1977

North Sydney 
This section is an excerpt from Electoral results for the Division of North Sydney § 1977

Parramatta 
This section is an excerpt from Electoral results for the Division of Parramatta § 1977

Paterson 
This section is an excerpt from Electoral results for the Division of Paterson § 1977

Phillip 
This section is an excerpt from Electoral results for the Division of Phillip § 1977

Prospect 
This section is an excerpt from Electoral results for the Division of Prospect § 1977

Reid
This section is an excerpt from Electoral results for the Division of Reid § 1977

Richmond 
This section is an excerpt from Electoral results for the Division of Richmond § 1977

Riverina 
This section is an excerpt from Electoral results for the Division of Riverina § 1977

Robertson 
This section is an excerpt from Electoral results for the Division of Robertson § 1977

Shortland 
This section is an excerpt from Electoral results for the Division of Shortland § 1977

St George 
This section is an excerpt from Electoral results for the Division of St George § 1977

Sydney 
This section is an excerpt from Electoral results for the Division of Sydney § 1977

Warringah 
This section is an excerpt from Electoral results for the Division of Warringah § 1977

Wentworth 
This section is an excerpt from Electoral results for the Division of Wentworth § 1977

Werriwa 
This section is an excerpt from Electoral results for the Division of Werriwa § 1977

Victoria

Balaclava 
This section is an excerpt from Electoral results for the Division of Balaclava § 1977

Ballaarat 
This section is an excerpt from Electoral results for the Division of Ballarat § 1977

Batman 
This section is an excerpt from Electoral results for the Division of Batman § 1977

Bendigo 
This section is an excerpt from Electoral results for the Division of Bendigo § 1977

Bruce 
This section is an excerpt from Electoral results for the Division of Bruce § 1977

Burke 
This section is an excerpt from Electoral results for the Division of Burke (1969–2004) § 1977

Casey 
This section is an excerpt from Electoral results for the Division of Casey § 1977

Chisholm 
This section is an excerpt from Electoral results for the Division of Chisholm § 1977

Corangamite 
This section is an excerpt from Electoral results for the Division of Corangamite § 1977

Corio 
This section is an excerpt from Electoral results for the Division of Corio § 1977

Deakin 
This section is an excerpt from Electoral results for the Division of Deakin § 1977

Diamond Valley 
This section is an excerpt from Electoral results for the Division of Diamond Valley § 1977

Flinders 
This section is an excerpt from Electoral results for the Division of Flinders § 1977

Gellibrand 
This section is an excerpt from Electoral results for the Division of Gellibrand § 1977

Gippsland 
This section is an excerpt from Electoral results for the Division of Gippsland § 1977

Henty 
This section is an excerpt from Electoral results for the Division of Henty § 1977

Higgins 
This section is an excerpt from Electoral results for the Division of Higgins § 1977

Holt 
This section is an excerpt from Electoral results for the Division of Holt § 1977

Hotham 
This section is an excerpt from Electoral results for the Division of Hotham § 1977

Indi 
This section is an excerpt from Electoral results for the Division of Indi § 1977

Isaacs 
This section is an excerpt from Electoral results for the Division of Isaacs § 1977

Kooyong 
This section is an excerpt from Electoral results for the Division of Kooyong § 1977

La Trobe 
This section is an excerpt from Electoral results for the Division of La Trobe § 1977

Lalor 
This section is an excerpt from Electoral results for the Division of Lalor § 1977

Mallee 
This section is an excerpt from Electoral results for the Division of Mallee § 1977

Maribyrnong 
This section is an excerpt from Electoral results for the Division of Maribyrnong § 1977

McMillan 
This section is an excerpt from Electoral results for the Division of McMillan § 1977

Melbourne 
This section is an excerpt from Electoral results for the Division of Melbourne § 1977

Melbourne Ports 
This section is an excerpt from Electoral results for the Division of Melbourne Ports § 1977

Murray 
This section is an excerpt from Electoral results for the Division of Murray § 1977

Scullin 
This section is an excerpt from Electoral results for the Division of Scullin § 1977

Wannon 
This section is an excerpt from Electoral results for the Division of Wannon § 1977

Wills 
This section is an excerpt from Electoral results for the Division of Wills § 1977

Queensland

Bowman 
This section is an excerpt from Electoral results for the Division of Bowman § 1977

Brisbane 
This section is an excerpt from Electoral results for the Division of Brisbane § 1977

Capricornia 
This section is an excerpt from Electoral results for the Division of Capricornia § 1977

Darling Downs 
This section is an excerpt from Electoral results for the Division of Darling Downs § 1977

Dawson 
This section is an excerpt from Electoral results for the Division of Dawson § 1977

Fadden 
This section is an excerpt from Electoral results for the Division of Fadden § 1977

Fisher 
This section is an excerpt from Electoral results for the Division of Fisher § 1977

Griffith 
This section is an excerpt from Electoral results for the Division of Griffith § 1977

Herbert 
This section is an excerpt from Electoral results for the Division of Herbert § 1977

Kennedy 
This section is an excerpt from Electoral results for the Division of Kennedy § 1977

Leichhardt 
This section is an excerpt from Electoral results for the Division of Leichhardt § 1977

Lilley 
This section is an excerpt from Electoral results for the Division of Lilley § 1977

Maranoa 
This section is an excerpt from Electoral results for the Division of Maranoa § 1977

McPherson 
This section is an excerpt from Electoral results for the Division of McPherson § 1977

Moreton 
This section is an excerpt from Electoral results for the Division of Moreton § 1977

Oxley 
This section is an excerpt from Electoral results for the Division of Oxley § 1977

Petrie 
This section is an excerpt from Electoral results for the Division of Petrie § 1977

Ryan 
This section is an excerpt from Electoral results for the Division of Ryan § 1977

Wide Bay 
This section is an excerpt from Electoral results for the Division of Wide Bay § 1977

South Australia

Adelaide 
This section is an excerpt from Electoral results for the Division of Adelaide § 1977

Barker 
This section is an excerpt from Electoral results for the Division of Barker § 1977

Bonython 
This section is an excerpt from Electoral results for the Division of Bonython § 1977

Boothby 
This section is an excerpt from Electoral results for the Division of Boothby § 1977

Grey 
This section is an excerpt from Electoral results for the Division of Grey § 1977

Hawker 
This section is an excerpt from Electoral results for the Division of Hawker § 1977

Hindmarsh 
This section is an excerpt from Electoral results for the Division of Hindmarsh § 1977

Kingston 
This section is an excerpt from Electoral results for the Division of Kingston § 1977

Port Adelaide 
This section is an excerpt from Electoral results for the Division of Port Adelaide § 1977

Sturt 
This section is an excerpt from Electoral results for the Division of Sturt § 1977

Wakefield 
This section is an excerpt from Electoral results for the Division of Wakefield § 1977

Western Australia

Canning 
This section is an excerpt from Electoral results for the Division of Canning § 1977

Curtin 
This section is an excerpt from Electoral results for the Division of Curtin § 1977

Forrest 
This section is an excerpt from Electoral results for the Division of Forrest § 1977

Fremantle 
This section is an excerpt from Electoral results for the Division of Fremantle § 1977

Kalgoorlie 
This section is an excerpt from Electoral results for the Division of Kalgoorlie § 1977

Moore 
This section is an excerpt from Electoral results for the Division of Moore § 1977

Perth 
This section is an excerpt from Electoral results for the Division of Perth § 1977

Stirling 
This section is an excerpt from Electoral results for the Division of Stirling § 1977

Swan 
This section is an excerpt from Electoral results for the Division of Swan § 1977

Tangney 
This section is an excerpt from Electoral results for the Division of Tangney § 1977

Tasmania

Bass 
This section is an excerpt from Electoral results for the Division of Bass § 1977

Braddon 
This section is an excerpt from Electoral results for the Division of Braddon § 1977

Denison 
This section is an excerpt from Electoral results for the Division of Denison § 1977

Franklin 
This section is an excerpt from Electoral results for the Division of Franklin § 1977

Wilmot 
This section is an excerpt from Electoral results for the Division of Wilmot § 1977

Australian Capital Territory

Canberra 
This section is an excerpt from Electoral results for the Division of Canberra § 1977

Fraser 
This section is an excerpt from Electoral results for the Division of Fraser (Australian Capital Territory) § 1977

Northern Territory 

This section is an excerpt from Electoral results for the Division of Northern Territory § 1977

See also 
 Candidates of the 1977 Australian federal election
 Members of the Australian House of Representatives, 1977–1980

References 

House of Representatives 1977